The Black Fashion Museum, sometimes also called the Black Fashion Museum is a former museum  that traced the historical contributions of black designers and clothing makers to fashion. Originally established in Harlem in 1979, and relocated to Washington, D.C. in 1994, the museum operated until 2007, when the Black Fashion Museum Collection was accepted into the collections of the National Museum of African American History and Culture.

History

The museum opened in the early 1970s and in 1979 moved to a Harlem brownstone on 126th street between Adam Clayton Powell Jr. Boulevard and Lenox Avenue as a means of telling African American history through fashion. Its collection comprises more than 700 garments, 300 accessories, and 60 boxes of archival material collected by Alexander-Lane throughout her life. Among the items in the museum's collection, a repository of garments designed by and made for people of the African Diaspora, are replicas of ballgowns created by Elizabeth Keckley, the once-enslaved dressmaker who became confidante to Mary Todd Lincoln. The work of Ann Lowe, who designed Jacqueline Bouvier's wedding dress for her marriage to John F. Kennedy, is also featured. It also included clothing and bonnets worn by slaves in the mid-1800s appear alongside an elaborately constructed opera cape made by a former slave. Other items include gowns by Ann Lowe, a pioneering African American designer whose patrons included the Rockefellers, the Du Ponts, the Vanderbilts, and Jacqueline Bouvier Kennedy.

Washington DC
Upon its move to Washington DC, the museum was located in a two-story row house on Vermont Avenue and faced increasing pressurest due to the economy and potential damage to the collection from the lack of a museum quality HVAC system. In 2007, Alexander-Lane's daughter, Joyce Bailey, donated the Black Fashion Museum's entire holdings to the National Museum of African American History and Culture. The research collection—one of the largest and rarest of its kind—includes a dress sewn by Rosa Parks shortly before her famous arrest in Montgomery, Ala.; a beige-patterned skirt worn by an enslaved child in Leesburg, Va.; the original Tin Man costume designed by Geoffrey Holder for the 1975 Broadway musical, The Wiz."

References

1979 establishments in New York City
1994 establishments in Washington, D.C.
2007 disestablishments in Washington, D.C.
Fashion museums in the United States
African-American museums in New York City